The Brookhaven Historic District in Atlanta, Georgia is a  historic district which was listed on the National Register of Historic Places in 1986.  The listing included 202 contributing buildings and two contributing structures.

It is located east of Peachtree-Dunwoody Road and north and east of Peachtree Road.  It spans across the border of DeKalb County and Fulton County.

It is a residential area laid out and developed beginning in 1910.

References

Historic districts on the National Register of Historic Places in Georgia (U.S. state)
National Register of Historic Places in DeKalb County, Georgia
National Register of Historic Places in Fulton County, Georgia
Buildings and structures completed in 1910